Mikael Rørdam (born 7 January 1959, Copenhagen) is a Danish mathematician, specializing in the theory of operator algebras and its applications.

Education and career
Rørdam graduated with master's degree from the University of Copenhagen in 1984. He received his PhD from the University of Pennsylvania with thesis The theory of unitary rank and regular approximation under the supervision of Richard Kadison. In the spring of 1988 Rørdam was a postdoc at the University of Toronto. At Odense University he was an Adjunkt (assistant professor) from 1988 to 1991 and a Lektor (associate professor) from 1991 to 1997. He was a Lektor at the University of Copenhagen from 1998 to 2002 and full professor from 2002 to 2007 at the University of Southern Denmark. Since 2008 he is a full professor at the University of Copenhagen.

Rørdam was elected a member of the Royal Danish Academy of Sciences and Letters in 2004. He was an invited speaker of the International Congress of Mathematicians in 2006 in Madrid. He was a member of the board of the Mittag-Leffler Institute from 2010 to 2016. He was a plenary speaker at the International Workshop on Operator Theory and its Applications (IWOTA) in 2018 in Shanghai.

Selected publications

Articles

 2004

Books

References

1959 births
Living people
Danish mathematicians
Members of the Royal Danish Academy of Sciences and Letters
University of Copenhagen alumni
University of Pennsylvania alumni
Academic staff of the University of Southern Denmark
Academic staff of the University of Copenhagen